The Florida Cup is an annual club association football friendly exhibition competition that is held in Florida, United States. Introduced in 2015, the competition has featured international clubs of the top 100 in the European rankings and the top 50 in the South American rankings. 

In its present form, the event winner can be decided by aggregate points or through a final playoff format match. The format of the event varies each year according to the schedules of the participating clubs' league schedules.

Editions

Records and Statistics

References

External links 
 

 
American soccer friendly trophies
Soccer in Florida
2015 establishments in Florida
Recurring sporting events established in 2015